Hobo is a sans-serif typeface.  It is unique for having virtually no straight lines or descenders. It was created by Morris Fuller Benton and issued by American Type Founders in 1910.  A light version, Light Hobo, was released in 1915.  Matrices were offered for mechanical composition by Intertype. The lower case letters provided the basis for Robert Wiebking's Advertisers Gothic of 1917.

This font may have originally been intended as an Art-Nouveau font due to its resemblance to other fonts of the time.

There are several theories regarding the font's name, and in fact it is widely recognized as one of the more interesting mysteries in typographic history. One theory states that its name came from a story stating that it was sketched in the early 1900s, sent to the foundry nameless, and progressed so little for so long, that it was called "that old hobo".  Hobo, originally called Adface, was finally patented in 1915 along with Light Hobo. The prevailing bow-legged shape of the letterforms inspired another long-held theory that it was so named because they resembled those of a bow-legged hobo.

The most complete and most plausible theory, by Peter Zelchenko, demonstrates how Benton, who lived and worked near a large Russian community, must have seen a particular cigar poster spelling what appears to read like "HOBO!" ("ново", Russian for "New!"). The poster's hand-lettering of the word bears striking and unique resemblances to the font; the shape of the O at the extreme right of the poster was probably traced by Benton to match his own Capital O precisely, and those shapes helped define the design of the font.

Digital versions of this face are often found in Mac OS and Microsoft Windows systems.

Usage in popular culture 

Hobo was used as the main typeface in the title sequence and promotional materials of the 1969 film Butch Cassidy and the Sundance Kid. 

Hobo was used in the opening titles of The Dukes of Hazzard.

Hobo was used as the main typeface in the title card sequence of Winx Club.

Hobo was used as the long closing credits of Tic-Tac-Dough.

Hobo was used as the typeface of The Legend of Spyro: A New Beginning and The Legend of Spyro: The Eternal Night.

Hobo was used as the opening and ending credits of the popular television show That '70s Show.

Hobo was used in Pantages Theatre's logo.

Hobo was used in the logo of Ubu Productions from 1982-2002.

Hobo also gets used in the Bon Appétit test kitchen videos.

Hobo was used in the ending credits of Polka Dot Door (sometimes).

Hobo was used in the opening and ending credits of Czech stop motion series Pat & Mat (episodes from 2000-2004).

References

External links 

Samples of Hobo
Flickr group dedicated to sightings of Hobo
Instagram hashtag dedicated to sightings of Hobo

Display typefaces
Typefaces and fonts introduced in 1910
American Type Founders typefaces
Sans-serif typefaces
Letterpress typefaces
Photocomposition typefaces
Digital typefaces
Art Nouveau typefaces
Typefaces designed by Morris Fuller Benton